The Kingdom of Burundi or Kingdom of Urundi (Royaume d'Urundi) was a Bantu kingdom in the modern-day Republic of Burundi. The Ganwa monarchs (with the title of mwami) ruled over both Hutus and Tutsis. Created in the 17th century, the kingdom was preserved under European colonial rule in the late 19th and early 20th century and was an independent state between 1962 and 1966.

History

Early history and German domination 

The date of the foundation of the Kingdom of Burundi is unknown, and the exact context of the state's foundation are disputed. The region was originally inhabited by Twa hunter-gatherers before the influx of Bantu farmers from about the 11th century. The Kingdom of Burundi was probably founded in the 16th or 17th century when pastoralists entered the area. The pastoralists arrived in waves and initially founded a number of small kingdoms, exploiting the lack of unity among the already settled farmers. After gaining control over the existing population, the newly arrived settlers ultimately assimilated them. The region's pastoralists were considered the ancestors of the later Tutsi ethnic group, while the agriculturalists became the Hutus.

The Kingdom of Burundi was founded by first mwami Ntare I (1675–1705). There exist different accounts about the ethnic origin of Ntare I. According to the "Kanyaru traditions", Ntare's royal clan and its associates were related to Rwanda's royal family, and had migrated from Rwanda to Burundi. Another telling of the events, provided by the "Nkoma cycle", suggests that the state's founders were ethnic Hutu and had migrated from Buha (modern Kigoma Region) to Nkoma before arriving in Burundi. It has also been proposed that the royal clan was descended from Hima pastoralists who had migrated from southern Ethiopia.

Under Ntare I, Burundi expanded and annexed a number of surrounding polities. Over time, his royal clan became separated from both the Tutsis as well as the Hutus, becoming known as the Ganwa and regarded as a de facto separate group. As a result of the Ganwa being neither Tutsi nor Hutu, the clan was able to keep the loyalty of both ethnic groups. The head of the Ganwa and ruler of Burundi was known as the mwami; however, the kingdom was extensively decentralised. Succession struggles were also common. Over time, four important lineages emerged in the Ganwa, namely the Bezi, Batare, Bataga, and Bambutsa. These lineages struggled for control, and the Bezi and Batare became especially fierce rivals. Infighting between these families became one of the major sources of conflict within Burundi.

After this early period of consolidation, Burundi was limited in its ability to expand due to bordering at other, more powerful states. In the early 19th century, the Kingdom of Burundi experienced an increase in power, and Ntare IV (1795–1852) was able to conquer several smaller Tutsi and Hutu kingdoms as well as areas which later became part of Rwanda and Tanzania. However, Ntare IV's decisions regarding his succession greatly affected the monarchy, as he appointed his sons as the administrators of the newly conquered territories. His sons, part of the Batare, became powerful nobles and dominated northern Burundi in the next decades. Ntare IV's heir, Mwezi IV of Burundi (1852–1908) fought with his siblings for control, but ultimately only managed to maintain control of half of Burundi. The rest remained under the control of his brothers and their descendants.

The first European explorers to reach Burundi were Richard Francis Burton and John Hanning Speke in 1858, followed by Henry Morton Stanley and David Livingstone in 1871. In 1890, Burundi was assigned to the German colonial empire as part of German East Africa, but was not effectively occupied or controlled by the colonial power. Besides establishing a military post in the area in 1896, Germany mainly opted to rule indirectly through the mwami, alternating between strengthening and limiting the power of the Burundian monarchy. In 1912, German colonial resident Erich von Langenn-Steinkeller moved the seat of the German administration from Usumbura to Gitega, close to the traditional heartland of the Burundian monarchy.

World War I and Belgian rule 
During World War I, Burundi was contested between Germany and the Allies. From 1914, the Ruzizi River marked the frontline in the area; in September 1915, German forces crossed the border and attacked Luvungi in the neighbouring Belgian Congo. After this attack was repelled by the Belgians, the Germans withdrew most of their Schutztruppe forces from the area. From then on, Burundi was only held by the Urundi Company led by Langenn-Steinkeller and the 14th Reserve Company; this garrison consisted of 36 Germans, 250 askari, and 100 Ruga-Ruga. In May 1916, Belgian troops broke through German defenses in Rwanda as part of the early stages of the Tabora offensive, and then turned south to capture Burundi. However, their attempt to capture the local German Schutztruppe garrison failed, as Langenn-Steinkeller's force successfully evaded them and retreated from the region. The Belgians occupied Burundi's capital of Gitega on 17 June 1916. The Burundian monarchy, at the time led by a regency council due to the minority of mwami Mwambutsa IV, officially surrendered to the Belgians ten days later. 

As a result of the atrocities committed in the Congo when it had been directly ruled by Leopold II of Belgium, the population of Burundi was generally fearful of the Belgians; though Force Publique troops did not assuage these fears, as they looted and harassed civilians, the Belgian takeover was mostly orderly and its new regime was initially "no harder (nor any easier)" than that of the Germans. The war years exerted a heavy toll on Burundi; locals were conscripted as porters and food requisitioned, resulting in many civilian deaths.

The Belgians were officially awarded Burundi, together with the neighbouring Kingdom of Rwanda, as an international mandate by the League of Nations in 1922. The Belgians preserved many of the kingdom's institutions intact, but in contrast to the limited overlordship by Germany, they exerted more control, imposing forced labor and more taxes. They also gradually deposed the country's chiefs and subchiefs. These developments led to increased social conflicts, and a series of peasant uprisings in the 1920s and 1930s. These rebellions targeted both the Belgians as well as the Batare lineage that was seen as being more closely aligned with the colonial power than the Bezi. Furthermore, the Belgians strengthened the division between Hutus and Tutsis, regarding the latter as a superior people and favoring them in the administration. This gave rise to more ethnic tensions.

Independence and end of the monarchy 
Whereas the similar Rwandan monarchy was abolished in a revolution between 1959 and 1961, the Burundian monarchy succeeded in surviving into the post-colonial period. By the early 1960s, Burundi's monarchy still held considerable popular support, both among the Tutsis as well as the Hutus.

After World War II, an independence movement developed in Burundi, and Belgium was pressured in gradually granting the country more autonomy. The state's independence movement was led by Louis Rwagasore, a prince of the Bezi clan and leader of the Union for National Progress (UPRONA). He hoped to avoid the ethnic and social conflicts of Rwanda, and was able to rally both Tutsis as well as Hutus to his cause. However, the Belgian administration was wary of Rwagasore's nationalism. It consequently supported the creation of the Christian Democratic Party (Parti Démocratique Chrétien, PDC) which rejected immediate independence and was regarded as more moderate. Before long, the parties were also drawn into the long-existing conflict among the nobility, as the Bezi backed UPRONA and the Batare supported the PDC. 

Aided by the Belgian authorities which placed Rwagasore under house arrest, the PDC won the country's first municipal elections in November 1960. In the 1961 Burundian legislative election, however, UPRONA achieved a landslide victory. Rwagasore became Prime Minister and assembled a government of national unity to prepare for full independence. His tenure was cut short when he was murdered on 13 October 1961 by his political rivals; the assassination was probably connected to the Batare-Bezi rivalry. Rwagasore's death derailed his attempts to build national inter-ethnic cohesion and facilitated the growth of Hutu-Tutsi tensions which would dominate the remaining years of the Kingdom of Burundi.

In 1962, the Kingdom of Burundi regained its independence as a constitutional monarchy in which the mwami held executive power and legislative power was given to the parliament. By late 1963, the Burundian government allowed Congolese revolutionary Gaston Soumialot to recruit thousands of fighters along the Burundian-Congolese border. Soumialot and his troops consequently participated in the Simba rebellion. Ethnic violence between the Hutu majority and the Tutsi minority rose between 1963 and 1965. This culminated in the murder of Prime Minister Pierre Ngendandumwe, a Hutu, in January 1965. The following legislative elections resulted in a Hutu majority in the National Assembly, but mwami Mwambutsa IV decided to appoint Léopold Biha, one of his confidants and a Ganwa, as the Prime Minister, hoping to maintain the monarchy's power. In response, a failed coup d'état was launched against the monarchy by Hutu officers in October 1965; Mwambutsa IV fled the country and refused to return, even as he claimed to still hold supreme power. The failed coup strengthened radical Tutsis. Mwambutsa's son, Ntare V, attempted to solve the crisis by deposing his father in the July 1966 coup d'état, but was himself ousted from power in a November 1966 coup d'état by his Prime Minister, Michel Micombero, who abolished the monarchy.

Politics and society

The Kingdom of Burundi was led by the mwami who presided over a large and powerful aristocracy. Before Burundi's colonization, the kingdom was highly decentralized; though this number fluctuated, on average there were 220 powerful noble lineages. The regional elite often held wide independence under the nominal overlordship of the mwami.

The flag of the kingdom contained a karyenda in the center as a symbol of royal authority.

Colonial system 

After the colonization of Burundi, a series of colonial residents were appointed to oversee the country, first by Germany and then by Belgium. These residents had far-reaching power, and also involved themselves in the internal politics of the kingdom. For instance, resident Langenn-Steinkeller appointed the regency council which governered Burundi during the minority of Mwambutsa IV. However, the resident system never fully functioned during the German rule, as most of the residents held their post only for a short time. In contrast, the Catholic Church and its representatives quickly garnered great influence in Burundi.

Social classes 
The royal clan, the Ganwa (or Baganwa), formed Burundi's leading elite. Though often associated with the Tutsis, the Ganwa constituted a socially, politically, and to some extent ethnically distinct group. Ranking directly below the Ganwa were the Banyamabanga, a prestigious and wealthy social class that assumed important political and ritualist positions at the royal court, the courts of regional leaders, and among the remaining population. The majority of the Banyamabanga belonged to Hutu lineages, most importantly the Bajiji; they were important enough to be involved in the selection processes for the mwami since the 19th century.

The Ganwa and Banyamabanga led the native administration which included the local authorities (Batware), delegates (Vyariho), and arbiters (Bashingantahe); these could be Tutsis or Hutus. The commoners were called Banyagihugu, including all who held no official positions, worked for their basic subsistence, and were required to provide tribute and serve as soldiers in war. The Banyagihugu were further divided into agriculturalists (birimizi), pastoralists (borozi), and artisans (banyamyuga). The majority of the birimizi were Hutus, while most Tutsis lived as borozi, though Hutu agriculturalists also often possessed cattle and Tutsi pastoralists grew crops. Generally, there was little hard distinction between Hutus and Tutsis during much of the kingdom's history. In fact, the Hima subgroup of the Tutsi was regarded as less prestigious than both the Ruguru-Tutsis and the Hutus; while the Ganwa intermarried with Rugurus and Hutus, they would not take Hima spouses. The bottom of the social hierarchy was formed by the Twa who lived as either hunter-gatherers or as potters. Even the Twa could advance socially, however, and be adopted into the clans belonging to other ethnic groups.

Legacy
Most members of the royal house live in exile in France today. In the 2005 elections, Princess Esther Kamatari ran for president for the Party for the Restoration of Monarchy and Dialogue in Burundi (Abahuza). Supporters believe that a restoration of a constitutional monarchy could help to ease the country's ethnic tensions.

See also
History of Burundi
Constitution of the Kingdom of Burundi
Rosa Paula Iribagiza

References

Works cited

Further reading

Burundian monarchy
Former monarchies of Africa
1860 establishments in Africa
1966 disestablishments in Africa
States and territories established in 1860
States and territories disestablished in 1966
17th-century establishments in Africa
1960s disestablishments in Burundi
Former monarchies